Nicklas Söderblom is a personal trainer, actor, and author currently residing in Los Angeles, United States. Söderblom is a personal trainer to many Hollywood stars (Pierce Brosnan, Olivia Newton-John, Rick Springfield, Linda Hamilton, and Backstreet Boys star AJ McLean and many more.) In 2007 he released the book Desperate Houseman writing about his relationship with actress Nicollette Sheridan, to whom he was engaged for a time.  Söderblom appeared in an episode of the ABC show Desperate Housewives as a fire fighter who comforted Sheridan's character Edie Britt when her house burned down.

In 2018, he was a contestant on Robinson: Fiji, and again in 2019 he was a contestant on Robinson 2019 which is broadcast on TV4.

Bibliography
 2007 – Desperate Houseman

TV appearances
 Desperate Housewives (season 1)
 Dr. Quinn, Medicine Woman (episode "Having it All")
 Spin City (episode "Fight Flub")

References

External links

Swedish male actors
Swedish male writers
Living people
1968 births
Exercise instructors